Debat or Débat may refer to:

Places:
Barbazan-Debat, commune in the Hautes-Pyrénées department in southwestern France
Bernac-Debat, commune in the Hautes-Pyrénées department in southwestern France
Bernadets-Debat, commune in the Hautes-Pyrénées department in southwestern France
Cazaux-Debat, commune in the Hautes-Pyrénées department in southwestern France
Chelle-Debat, commune in the Hautes-Pyrénées department in southwestern France
Loussous-Débat, commune in the Gers department in southwestern France
Oléac-Debat, commune in the Hautes-Pyrénées department in southwestern France
Ponson-Debat-Pouts, commune in the Pyrénées-Atlantiques department in southwestern France

People:
Alexis Debat (born 1977), French commentator on terrorism and national security, based in Washington D.C., USA
Alphonse Massamba-Débat (1921–1977), political figure of the Republic of the Congo
Stade Alphonse Massemba-Débat in Brazzaville is the national stadium of the Republic of the Congo
Claude Bérit-Débat (born 1946), member of the Senate of France, representing the Dordogne department

See also
Debate